Salhi Baisaa is Maldivian comedy drama television series created and developed by Mohamed Niyaz. It stars Ahmed Nimal, Hassan Haleem, Ahmed Simau and Ibrahim Khaleel in main roles. The series follows an old citizen, Ali, who brags about his fake accomplishment in his youth.

Cast and characters

Main
 Ahmed Nimal as Ali
 Ahmed Simau as Qadhir/Sodhuree/Fareed/Razzaq/Javid/Dawood/Kahurab/Daroga
 Ibrahim Khaleel as Sobree/Rushdhee/Lomir/Sujau
 Hassan Manik as Sodhuree/Latheef
 Hassan Haleem as Ali Idhurees/Hassan/Jaufar

Recurring
 Fathimath Rameeza as Mariyam/Ziyadha/Zubeidha/Ithura
 Waleedha Waleed as Zainab/Leela
 Shadhiya as Qadhir's wife/Zubeidha/Saeedha
 Sharumeela as Samiya
 Muaz as Ali's friend/Jamsheedh
 Ibrahim Shakir as Zubeidha's father/Shakir
 Ahmed Naeem as Ali's friend
 Aadhanu as Ahmedfulhu

Guest
 Abdulla Zaki as Professor Jaruman Ali (Episode 3)
 Waheedha as Sofiyya (Episode 4)
 Ahmedullah (Episode 4)
 Ibrahim Riyaz (Episode 5)
 Mohamed Shan (Episode 5)
 Abdulla Shameel (Episode 6)
 Fazuna Mohamed as Anna (Episode 6)
 Ziyad (Episode 6)
 Aminath as Jamsheed's girlfriend (Episode 7)
 Faruhadh (Episode 7)
 Ibrahim Rasheed as Nihan (Episode 8)

Episodes

Development
The series was developed based on a concept outlined by director Mohamed Niyaz. However, since he is not a professional screenwriter, Niyaz was assisted by lead actor Ahmed Nimal in drafting and finalizing the screenplay. In its second season, Niyaz took over the task of screenwriting alongside the work of editing and directing the series. The main concept of the series was Ahmed Nimal flexing about his fake accomplishments to Ibrahim Khaleel while relaxing on a swing located at the road end of Lonuziyaaraiy Magu.

Soundtrack

Release and reception
The series was aired through Television Maldives, during the month of Ramadan. It was widely accepted as one of the most "unusually funny" television series developed during the time. The episodes released during 1992 was particularly noted by audience and critics as the "series best episodes". It was noted as the most popular local television production aired in Ramadan of 1991 and 1992.

References

Serial drama television series
Maldivian television shows